Turbonilla dalli, common name the Dall's turbonille,  is a species of sea snail, a marine gastropod mollusk in the family Pyramidellidae, the pyrams and their allies.

Description
This is a large, stout, regularly coiled shell. It is bluish  white, semitransparent with  a dull  lustre. Its length varies between 5 mm and 13 mm. The suture  is unusually deep, but not channeled. The prominent protoconch contains two projecting whorls transverse to  the  axis. The twelve whorls of the teleoconch are very convex. The 16 transverse ribs are often opaque white, very  prominent, and slightly oblique. They are separated by very deep, concave, about equally wide spaces, which terminate in clean, square-cut ends, sometimes just above the suture. The base of the shell is short, moderately convex and smooth.  The aperture is squarish. The outer lip is thin, greatly  expanded, and turning in abruptly to meet the straight, much thickened, not  reflected, columellar lip in a rounded angle. The  entire surface is covered with exceedingly fine microscopic striae.

Distribution

This marine species occurs in the following locations at depths between 0 m and 6 m:
 Caribbean Sea
 Gulf of Mexico : off Florida
 Mexico
 Atlantic Ocean : off North Carolina

References

External links
 To Biodiversity Heritage Library (7 publications)
 To Encyclopedia of Life
 To USNM Invertebrate Zoology Mollusca Collection
 To ITIS
 To World Register of Marine Species

dalli
Gastropods described in 1899